The Scianna blood antigen system consists of seven antigens. These include two high frequency antigens Sc1 and Sc3, and two low frequency antigens Sc2 and Sc4.

The very rare null phenotype is characterised by the absence of Sc1, Sc2 and Sc3.

The antigens are caused by changes in the erythroid membrane associated protein (ERMAP).

History 
This blood group system was discovered in 1962 when a high frequency antigen was detected in a young woman (Ms. Scianna) who had experienced several late pregnancy losses due to haemolytic disease of the fetus.

References 

Antigens
Blood
Cell biology